KAMS (95.1 FM) is a radio station licensed to Mammoth Spring, Arkansas, United States. The station is currently owned by E-Communications, LLC.

The format is known as K Kountry 95.

References

External links

AMS